The Clock Tower of Murshidabad (locally known just as Clock Tower or Ghari Ghar, also known as Big Ben of Murshidabad) is a clock tower in the Nizamat Fort Campus in West Bengal, India. The clock tower stands in the garden space between the Nizamat Imambara and the Hazarduari Palace; to its east, hardly a few feet away, is the old Madina Mosque and the Bacchawali Tope.

The clock tower was designed by Sagor Mistri, an Indian Bengali assistant of Colonel McLeod, the architect of the Hazarduari Palace.

The clock tower is surmounted by a heavy sounding bell. Four masonry shields are placed on the ground level four corners. The dial of the clock tower faces eastwards, towards the Bhagirathi River, most probably for the sailors and passengers travelling on boats.

Map

References

External links

 

Tourist attractions in Murshidabad
Clock towers in India
Buildings and structures in Murshidabad district